Wang Jialiu (born March 1929) is a Chinese politician who served as party secretary of Peking University from 1991 to 1994 and executive deputy president of the CCP Central Party School from 1993 to 1998.

She was an alternate member of the 12th and 13th Central Committee of the Chinese Communist Party, and a member of the 14th Central Committee of the Chinese Communist Party. She was a member of the Standing Committee of the 9th National People's Congress.

Biography
Wang was born in Pinghu County (now Pinghu), Zhejiang, in March 1929. She attended Shanghai Nanping Girls' School. She joined the Chinese Communist Party (CCP) in January 1946. In September 1946, she enrolled at the College of Agriculture, Peking University, but shifted to the study of literature later.

After founding of the Communist State in 1949, Wang worked in the Beijing Municipal Committee of the Communist Youth League of China, and was assigned to state-owned enterprises in Beijing in 1972. She was recalled to the CCP Beijing Municipal Committee in October 1975 and eventually became deputy party secretary in September 1988. She also served as deputy party secretary of Tsinghua University. She was appointed party secretary of Peking University in January 1991, in addition to serving as executive deputy president of the CCP Central Party School since July 1993.

In March 1998, she took office as vice chairperson of the National People's Congress Education, Science, Culture and Public Health Committee.

References

1929 births
Living people
People from Pinghu
National University of Peking alumni
Academic staff of Peking University
Academic staff of Tsinghua University
People's Republic of China politicians from Zhejiang
Chinese Communist Party politicians from Zhejiang
Alternate members of the 12th Central Committee of the Chinese Communist Party
Alternate members of the 13th Central Committee of the Chinese Communist Party
Members of the 14th Central Committee of the Chinese Communist Party
Members of the Standing Committee of the 9th National People's Congress